The South Park Community Church is an historic Carpenter Gothic-style church building located at 600 Hathaway Street in Fairplay, Park County, Colorado. Built in 1874, the church was founded by Presbyterian missionary Sheldon Jackson. Its board and batten siding and lancet windows are typical of Carpenter Gothic churches. Originally the Sheldon Jackson Memorial Chapel, the structure is now the South Park Community (Presbyterian) Church.
 
On November 22, 1977, the church was added to the National Register of Historic Places.

References

Churches on the National Register of Historic Places in Colorado
Carpenter Gothic church buildings in Colorado
Presbyterian churches in Colorado
Churches completed in 1874
19th-century churches in the United States
Buildings and structures in Park County, Colorado
National Register of Historic Places in Park County, Colorado